Caryomys is a genus of rodent in the family Cricetidae. The genus contains the following species:

 Ganzu vole (Caryomys eva)
 Kolan vole (Caryomys inez)

References

 
Rodent genera
Taxa named by Oldfield Thomas